Gravelly Beach is a locality and small rural community in the local government area of West Tamar, in the Western Tamar Valley region of Tasmania. The Tamar River forms the eastern boundary. The 2016 census determined a population of 567 for the state suburb of Gravelly Beach.

History
The locality was originally known (in 1910) as Sallaby.

Road infrastructure
The C728 route (Gravelly Beach Road) runs east from the West Tamar Highway and passes through the locality from south-east to north-west, providing access to several other localities.

References

Localities of West Tamar Council
Towns in Tasmania